Osa de la Vega is a municipality in Cuenca, Castile-La Mancha, Spain. It has a population of 639.

Municipalities in the Province of Cuenca